The Little Swan River is a  tributary of the Swan River of central Minnesota, United States. It is part of the Mississippi River watershed.

See also
List of rivers of Minnesota

References

Minnesota Watersheds
USGS Hydrologic Unit Map - State of Minnesota (1974)

Rivers of Minnesota
Tributaries of the Mississippi River